Johan Petersen Fjord, also known as Petersen Bay, is a fjord in King Christian IX Land, Eastern Greenland.
The fjord is named after Danish Arctic explorer Johan Petersen (1813–1880).

Geography
The Bruckner and Heim glaciers discharge at the head of the fjord.

Qeertartivatsiaq Island is located on the northern side of the entrance of the fjord. There are Inuit ruins on the southern shore of the island facing the fjord.

Bibliography
Spencer Apollonio, Lands That Hold One Spellbound: A Story of East Greenland, 2008

See also
List of fjords of Greenland

References

External links
Den grønlandske Lods - Geodatastyrelsen 
East Greenland: Exploring Johan Petersen Fjord

Fjords of Greenland